Barnby Moor is a village and civil parish in the Bassetlaw district of Nottinghamshire, England, with a population of 257 (2001 census), increasing to the 2011 Census to 278. The village is about three miles north of East Retford.

Geography
The A638 passes through the village.

Bilby exclave

The hamlet of Bilby is within the parish of Barnby Moor constituting a detached portion thereof due to being separated by narrow strips of Hodsock and Babworth. This means Barnby Moor is one of a very small number of civil parishes in England to still have a detached portion.

People
Beatrice Tomasson, the mountaineer, was born here in 1859 to William and Sarah Anne Tomasson, she was their second child.

See also
Listed buildings in Barnby Moor

References

External links
 
 

 
Villages in Nottinghamshire
Civil parishes in Nottinghamshire
Bassetlaw District
Enclaves and exclaves